Maloarkhangelsky District is an administrative and municipal district (raion), one of the twenty-four in Oryol Oblast, Russia. It is located in the south of the oblast. Its administrative center is the town of Maloarkhangelsk. Population: 11,520 (2010 Census);  The population of Maloarkhangelsk accounts for 31.4% of the district's total population.

References

Notes

Sources

Districts of Oryol Oblast